Turist Ömer or Ömer the Tourist is a recurring character in a series of comic films made in Turkey between 1964 and 1973. The character was played by Sadri Alışık.

Turist Ömer first appeared as a supporting character in a 1963 film by Hulki Saner Helal Olsun Ali Abi. He was a friend of the protagonist's in that film. The character was liked so much by the people that a whole series of feature films was produced with him as the lead character played by another famous Turkish actor Ayhan Işık.

Movies
 Turist Ömer (Ömer the Tourist, 1964)
 Ayşecik - Cimcime Hanım (Ayşecik: Naughty Lady, 1964)
 Turist Ömer dümenciler kralı (1965)
 Turist Ömer Almanya'da (Ömer the Tourist in Germany, 1966)
 Turist Ömer Arabistan'da (1969)
 Turist Ömer Yamyamlar Arasında (1970)
 Turist Ömer Boğa Güreşçisi (1971)
 Turist Ömer Uzay Yolunda (Ömer the Tourist in Star Trek, 1973), comedic reworking of The Man Trap, this film is colloquially known as the Turkish Star Trek

Turkish comedy films
Fictional Turkish people
Films set in Turkey